On the Western Front is D.I.'s seventh full-length. Like their previous album Caseyology (2002), frontman Casey Royer is the only original member performing on this album. Work on the album began in 2004, but it was not released until 2007. The album was delayed numerous times before finally being completed in 2007. The reason for the delay was because of a touring schedule and record company problems before they signed Suburban Noize Records, who released this album.

Track listing
 "On the Western Front" (2:13)
 "OC's Burning" (3:01)
 "Disease" (2:35)
 "Gutters of Paradise" (3:19)
 "Prison Riot" (2:21)
 "Punk Rock Suicide" (3:02)
 "Skate or Die" (0:51)
 "Voices" (3:22)
 "Fatso Nero" (2:11)
 "Just Like You" (2:50)
 "PCH" (1:38)
 "It's Over" (2:37)

Trivia
An older version of Gutters Of Paradise appears on the Finger Records compilation "Redefining Scenes 2"

Personnel
 Casey Royer - Vocals
 Chckn - Guitars
 Clinton - Guitars
 Eddie Tater - Bass
 Joey Tater - Drums

References

D.I. (band) albums
2007 albums